Combined Forces Command may refer to:
ROK/US Combined Forces Command in South Korea since 1978
Combined Forces Command-Afghanistan  2001–7